The Gulfport Public Library serves the city of Gulfport, in Pinellas County, Florida. It is located at 5501 28th Ave South, Gulfport, Florida 33707. It is a member of the Pinellas Public Library Cooperative. The library provides access to genealogical research via ancestry.com in the library. It also participates in the Florida Memory Project via the Florida Photography Collection. Gulfport Public Library also provides access to digital content in the form of e-books through participation with Project Gutenberg and other e-book services. In 2018, the Gulfport Public Library received the GLBTRT Newlen-Symons Award for Excellence in Serving the LGBT Community.

History 
Prior to the founding of the Gulfport Public Library, the need for such a resource was recognized by Julia Lucky who, in 1935, started a small library from her own collection and donations from friends in the back of a drugstore.

When Lucky's house burned down and she moved away, a new group took up the task of attempting to establish a local library which opened on May 15, 1935. This group was headed by Mayor Andrew Potter and his wife, who formed a Library Group of people dedicated towards working on building the library. The appointed Librarian at this time was Mrs. Margaret Clees and it was kept in a small one room building that had been a former real estate office. The library eventually moved into a five-room bungalow where it would remain through a series of additions until 1976.

Services
The Gulfport Public Library is known for its LGBTQ support by providing resources distinctly for the LGBTQ community through their LGBTQ Resource Center. They also offer scholarships for the LGBTQ scholar and publish an electronic newsletter.

The Circle of Friends of the Gulfport Library organizes the "Conversations Club" that offers "Lunch in a Foreign Language" during the week day at the Gulfport Public Library. This organization fosters community among people who speak foreign languages and those who want to learn. If you want to speak Italian, then go to the Gulfport Library on Tuesdays at 12:30 p.m., Spanish speakers gather on Wednesdays at 12:30 p.m., and Fridays at 12:30 p.m. are for German Speakers. French is spoken on Tuesdays at 3:00 p.m., the only later time slot. What these conversation clubs offer is "casual chats in a comfortable setting".

Aside from basic online resources, The Gulfport Public Library offers Crisis Resources which includes Crisis Hotline, resources for veterans, women and families and for services for the homeless with listings of shelters and contact information for those in need. The Gulfport Public Library also offers LGBTQ Resources with a film series, national resources, Florida resources, trans resources, and local gay affirming churches.

References

Libraries in Florida
Public libraries in Florida